Karol Fila (born 13 June 1998) is a Polish professional footballer who plays as a right-back for Belgian club Zulte Waregem, on loan from Strasbourg.

Career statistics

Notes

Honours
Lechia Gdańsk
Polish Cup: 2018–19
Polish Super Cup: 2019

References

External links

1998 births
Living people
Polish footballers
Poland under-21 international footballers
Association football defenders
Lechia Gdańsk players
Chojniczanka Chojnice players
RC Strasbourg Alsace players
S.V. Zulte Waregem players
Ekstraklasa players
I liga players
Ligue 1 players
Polish expatriate footballers
Expatriate footballers in France
Expatriate footballers in Belgium
Polish expatriate sportspeople in France
Polish expatriate sportspeople in Belgium